Silvio Javier Pedro Miñoso (born 23 December 1976) is a Cuban retired footballer.

Club career
He played his entire career at provincial team Villa Clara, forming an experienced defense line with players like Odelín Molina and Yénier Márquez.

International career
Pedro made his international debut for Cuba in a January 2002 friendly match against Guatemala and has earned a total of 66 caps, scoring no goals. He represented his country in 9 FIFA World Cup qualification matches and played at 4 CONCACAF Gold Cup final tournaments.

His final international was a December 2008 Gold Cup qualifier match against Guadeloupe.

References

External links
 

1976 births
Living people
Association football defenders
Cuban footballers
Cuba international footballers
2002 CONCACAF Gold Cup players
2003 CONCACAF Gold Cup players
2005 CONCACAF Gold Cup players
2007 CONCACAF Gold Cup players
FC Villa Clara players
People from Santa Clara, Cuba